Lawson Heights Suburban Centre is a neighbourhood that is maturing, and is located in north east Saskatoon. The neighbourhood features high density residential areas, major commercial suburban development area centre, transit mall, large green space parks which are slated for upgrade, and secondary institution. It is situated just east of the North West Industrial SDA and near the South Saskatchewan River  Lawson Heights Suburban Centre combines a proximity to amenities offered by a comprehensive industrial development and the scenic river and river bank park system.

Location
Within the Lawson Suburban Development Area (West Side) is the neighbourhood of Lawson Heights Suburban Centre.  With Saguenay Drive to the east for a short strip.  This SC widens out in a triangular shape with La Ronge Road to the south, not including St. Anne's School, Primrose Drive continues on the south side.  Warman Road or the Canadian National Railway line comprises the westernmost border.  Pinehouse Drive and Lenore Drive comprise the northern border. Bishop James Mahoney School and Bishop James P. Mahoney Park are part of the Lawson Heights Suburban Centre.

Shopping

The Mall at Lawson Heights at the intersection of Warman Road and Primrose Drive is the community's primary commercial hub. Built in the early 1980s, it was notable for being the first Saskatoon mall to feature a food court (all of the city's other malls later added ones of their own). The area also has an assortment of standalone and strip-mall commercial development.

Layout
Bishop James Mahoney High School and Bishop James Park comprises the eastern border of the neighbourhood along Primrose Drive. A shopping mall complex, several satellite shopping strip malls, Lawson Civic Centre, high school, parks, apartments and condominiums are nestled within a residential neighbourhood set out in a court system layout.  Bethany Tower, Bethany Villa  and Primrose Chateau are senior's residences located in the Lawson Heights Suburban Centre.

Government and politics
Lawson Heights Suburban Centre exists within the federal electoral district of Saskatoon—University. It is currently represented by Corey Tochor of the Conservative Party of Canada, first elected in 2019.

Provincially, the area is divided by Primrose Drive and Pinehouse Drive into two constituencies. The southeastern portion lies within the constituency of Saskatoon Meewasin. It is currently represented by Ryan Meili of the Saskatchewan New Democratic Party, first elected in a 2017 by-election. The northwestern portion lies within the constituency of Saskatoon Northwest. It is currently represented by Gordon Wyant of the Saskatchewan Party, first elected in a 2010 by-election.

In Saskatoon's non-partisan municipal politics, Lawson Heights Suburban Centre lies within ward 5. It is currently represented by Randy Donauer, first elected in 2010.

Recreation

 Saskatoon Kinsmen / Henk Ruys Soccer Centre.
 Lawson Civic Centre opened in 1989 in conjunction with the
Saskatoon's first wave pool
Tropical beach like pool where the water starts at 0 and tapers off until finally reaching a depth of 6 feet (2 metres).
Water Features such as whirl pool, and toddler's pool
Multipurpose Room
Indoor Playground
Fitness Room
Poolside Deck
Outdoor Park area.

Library
 Rusty MacDonald Branch Library located in the Lawson Civic Centre celebrated its grand opening in 1989.

Education
Bishop James Mahoney High School

Area Parks
Bishop James P. Mahoney Park
Umea Park
Umea Vast Park - slated for upgrade

Transportation

City Transit
Lawson Heights Suburban Centre serviced by a Saskatoon Transit Bus Terminal Mall.

References

External links

Local Area Planning
Selling an Idea or a Product
 Saskatoon Retail Survey
BPAR 2005.indd Business Profiles Newsletter
Planning District Review Technical Report No. 1:
City of Saskatoon City of Saskatoon · Departments · Community Services · City Planning · ZAM Maps
Populace Spring 2006

Neighbourhoods in Saskatoon